Yuriy Mykolayovych Kolomoyets (born 22 March 1990) is a Ukrainian professional footballer who plays as a striker for Mynai.

Career
Kolomoyets is a product of the Kryvbas Kryvyi Rih youth sportive school systems. His first trainer was Volodymyr Udod.

On 14 February 2021, Kolomoyets began training with Tajik Champions Istiklol.

References

External links
 
 

1990 births
Living people
Ukrainian footballers
FC Naftovyk-Ukrnafta Okhtyrka players
FC Hirnyk Kryvyi Rih players
FC Oleksandriya players
FC Kryvbas Kryvyi Rih players
Ukrainian Premier League players
Ukrainian First League players
Ukrainian Second League players
Sportspeople from Kryvyi Rih
FC Vorskla Poltava players
MTK Budapest FC players
FCI Levadia Tallinn players
FC Istiklol players
FC Volyn Lutsk players
FC Polissya Zhytomyr players
FC Mynai players
Meistriliiga players
Ukrainian expatriate footballers
Expatriate footballers in Hungary
Ukrainian expatriate sportspeople in Hungary
Expatriate footballers in Estonia
Ukrainian expatriate sportspeople in Estonia
Ukraine international footballers
Association football forwards
Tajikistan Higher League players
Ukrainian expatriate sportspeople in Tajikistan
Expatriate footballers in Tajikistan